Mamirolle is a commune in the Doubs department in the Bourgogne-Franche-Comté region in eastern France.

Geography
It is situated at the foot of a wooded hill and is crossed by the railroad from Besançon to Le Locle.

The landscape of the town forms a wide basin with no surface drainage, since the rainwater seeps into the subsoil. Most of the land in Mamirolle is arable land and meadow land, with some parts covered in forest. Southern part of the commune extends over the slope of Mamirolle to the wooded ridge of Mont Bon, which forms the highest point in the commune at 662 m above sea level.

History 
Archeological research determined that Mamirolle was populated very early on. A nearby Tumulus dates from the Hallstatt period, and traces of an alleged Gallo-Roman settlement site was also discovered.

Mamirolle was first mentioned in 1220 as a church with the name Mamirollis. Over time, the spelling was changed to Mimiroles (1150), Memiroules (1267), and Memiruelles (1350), until it changed to today's Mamirolle in 1547. Since the Middle Age, Mamirolle has been belonging to the Montfaucon dominion. With the Treaties of Nijmegen in 1678, the village was passed over to France along with the rest of Franche-Comté. Mamirolle was repeatedly devastated by major fires, such as in 1709, 1825 and 1893.

Sights 
The Saint-Pierre Church, which used to be a medieval chapel, was rebuilt in 1775 and extensively restored in 1985. Various farmhouses in Franche-Comté style from the 17th to 19th centuries have been preserved in the town center.

Population

Industry 
Until well into the 20th century, Mamirolle's economic was heavily dependent on agriculture and forestry. Commercial zones have developed on the outskirts of the village since the 1970s. Various companies in the food processing, construction, micro-mechanics and electronic sectors have settled here. In the meantime, the village has also changed into a residential community.

See also
 Communes of the Doubs department

References

External links

 Mamirolle on the intercommunal Web site of the department 

Communes of Doubs